Ripper Collins may refer to:
 Ripper Collins (baseball)
 Ripper Collins (wrestler)